The Ann Arbor Observer is a monthly newsprint magazine delivered free to all permanent residents of the Ann Arbor, Michigan school district and postal service area. The magazine was launched in 1976. 

The Ann Arbor Observer Company also owns and operates the Community Observer, a quarterly magazine delivered free to all permanent residents of the Chelsea, Michigan, Dexter, Michigan, Manchester, Michigan, and Saline, Michigan postal service areas; the biennial Guest Guide, available arborlist.com (free classified ads), washtenawguide.com(a guide to living and working in the Community Observer area), and AnnArborObserver.com (a comprehensive online guide to Ann Arbor with daily, weekly, and monthly events listings).

References

External links
 

Monthly magazines published in the United States
News magazines published in the United States
American news websites
Free magazines
Local interest magazines published in the United States
Magazines established in 1976
Magazines published in Michigan
Mass media in Ann Arbor, Michigan